Ravipalli is a village in Garugubilli mandal in the revenue division of Parvathipuram in Parvathipuram Manyam district of India.

Census
Ravipalli had a population of 5,200 in 2007. Males constitute 3,388 and females constitute 1,820 of the population. The average literacy rate is 64%. Male literacy rate is 68% and that of females 39%.

References

Villages in Parvathipuram Manyam district